Cazals may refer to:

Geographical
Cazals is the name or part of the name of several communes in France:
 Cazals, in the Lot department
 Cazals, in the Tarn-et-Garonne department
 Cazals-des-Baylès, in the Ariège department

Music
 Cazals (band), a rock band from London, England